John Collins (born June 25, 1943) is an American college basketball coach, educator, lawyer, and a Republican Party politician from New Jersey. He was Speaker of the New Jersey General Assembly from 1996 until 2002, making him the longest serving speaker in Assembly history.

Biography
Collins was born in Atlantic City and moved to Gloucester City, New Jersey at a young age. He attended Gloucester Catholic High School, where he excelled at basketball. He went on to Glassboro State College (now Rowan University), receiving a B.A. degree in science education in 1964 and a master's degree in student personnel services in 1967. With the Glassboro Profs basketball team, Collins scored 1,038 points in his career, earning him a place in the South Jersey Basketball Hall of Fame.

After graduation, he taught science and coached basketball at Sterling High School. The following year he was invited to become basketball coach at the newly established Camden County College. A year later he became head coach at Glassboro State, and at 26 was one of the youngest head basketball coaches in the country. As coach he racked up 131 victories and three consecutive conference titles. At Glassboro State he also served in the Admissions Office and worked as executive assistant to college president Herman James.

After retiring from his coaching career, Collins studied law at Rutgers School of Law–Camden, receiving his Juris Doctor degree in 1982. After a term on his local school board, the chairman of the Salem County Republican party asked him to run for the New Jersey General Assembly. Riding the coattails of Governor of New Jersey Thomas Kean in 1985, Collins and his running mate Gary Stuhltrager knocked off Democratic incumbents Martin A. Herman and Thomas A. Pankok, helping give the Republicans control of the General Assembly for the first time in more than a decade. He took office in 1986, representing the 3rd Legislative District.

When Republicans lost control of the Assembly in 1989, Collins was chosen by minority leader Chuck Haytaian to be his deputy. He became majority leader two years later when Republicans regained control of the Assembly and Haytaian was elected Speaker. In 1996, after Haytaian decided not to run for reelection following his unsuccessful 1994 campaign against Senator Frank Lautenberg, Collins succeeded Haytaian as speaker.

For six years he served as Assembly speaker with Donald DiFrancesco serving as New Jersey Senate President. Collins explored a campaign for Governor of New Jersey in the 2001 Republican primary against DiFrancesco (then Acting Governor) but ultimately decided against running. DiFrancesco would be forced to withdraw from the primary after questions about his business dealings.

Collins retired from the General Assembly in January 2002 after serving 16 years. He joined the Princeton Public Affairs Group, a prominent lobbying firm, as senior counsel.

Collins and his wife Betsy have resided on a  farm in Pittsgrove Township since 1974. He has four children and ten grandchildren.

References

|-

1943 births
Living people
Speakers of the New Jersey General Assembly
Republican Party members of the New Jersey General Assembly
New Jersey lawyers
Sportspeople from Atlantic City, New Jersey
Gloucester Catholic High School alumni
People from Gloucester City, New Jersey
People from Pittsgrove Township, New Jersey
Rowan University alumni
Rutgers School of Law–Camden alumni